Rosella Postorino (Reggio Calabria, 1978) is an Italian author. In 2013 she won the International Prize Città di Penne and in 2018 she won the Rapallo Carige Prize and the Premio Campiello.

Life

Born in Reggio Calabria, southern Italy, in 1978, Postorino was raised in San Lorenzo al Mare, Liguria, northern Italy. In 2001 she moved to Rome.

Postorino published her first story "In una capsula" (In a Capsule) in 2004 in the anthology Ragazze che dovresti conoscere (Girls you Should Know). In 2007 she released her first novel, La stanza di sopra (The Room Upstairs).

Her 2018 novel Le assaggiatrici (At the Wolf's Table) won the 56th Campiello Prize, the Luigi Russo Prize, the Rapallo Prize and the Premio Vigevano Lucio Mastronardi.

Postorino has also translated and edited works by Marguerite Duras.

Works

Novels 
 La stanza di sopra, Vicenza: Neri Pozza, 2007 
 L'estate che perdemmo Dio, Turin: Einaudi, 2009 
 Il corpo docile, Turin: Einaudi, 2013 
Le assaggiatrici, Milan: Feltrinelli, 2018 . Pulibshed in English as At the Wolf's Table, trans. Leah Janeczko, New York: Flatiron books, 2019 .

Nonfiction 
 Il mare in salita, Rome – Bari: GLF editori Laterza, 2011

Anthology 
 Ragazze che dovresti conoscere, Turin: Einaudi, 2004 
 Working for paradise, Milan: Bompiani, 2009

Translations 
 Moderato cantabile of Marguerite Duras, Trieste: Nonostante, 2013 
 Testi segreti di Marguerite Duras, Trieste: Nonostante, 2015

Bibliography 
 Anticorpi: dialoghi con Emma Dante e Rosella Postorino di Luisa Cavaliere, Napoli, Liguori, 2010

References

External links 
 Rosella Postorino biography
 Catalogo del servizio bibliotecario nazionale
 Interview of Rosella Postorino

1978 births
Living people
People from Reggio Calabria
20th-century Italian women writers
21st-century Italian women writers
Italian translators
Premio Campiello winners
French–Italian translators